The 2019 Patriot League baseball tournament took place on consecutive weekends, with the semifinals held May 11–12 and the finals May 17–19.  The higher seeded teams hosted each best of three series.  The winner, Army, earned the conference's automatic bid to the 2019 NCAA Division I baseball tournament.

Seeding
The top four finishers from the regular season were seeded one through four, with the top seed hosting the fourth seed and second seed hosting the third.  The visiting team was designated as the home team in the second game of each series.

Results

Championship series

References

Tournament
Patriot League Baseball Tournament